Tai Baribo (born 15 January 1998) is an Israeli professional footballer who plays as a forward for Austrian Bundesliga club Wolfsberg and the Israel national team.

Early life
Baribo was born and raised in Eilat, Israel, to an Israeli family of Sephardi Jewish descent. He explained that as an adult he has found out that the meaning of his unusual first name is a Hebrew acronym for the phrase "The Torah of the Land of Israel". His mother Maya died of cancer when he was 11 years of age, and since then Baribo has decided that his career is dedicated to the memory of her. His father Itzik owns a Water Sports Center in Eilat, Israel, where Baribo was first noticed for his talent as an 11 years old youngster. He is the youngest of three children.

He was enlisted in the Israel Defense Forces (IDF) as a soldier in 2016, until his honorable discharge in 2019.

He also holds a Portuguese passport, on account of his Sephardi Jewish ancestors, which eases the move to certain European football leagues.

Club career

Maccabi Petah Tikva
Baribo started playing football for Israeli side Hapoel Rishon LeZion. Due to the long distance, he had to get to team training on flights. When he reached the age of 15, he signed with Maccabi Petah Tikva.

On 1 March 2017, Baribo made his senior debut in the 1–2 loss against Maccabi Tel Aviv in the 2016–17 Israel State Cup.

Wolfsberger AC
Baribo signed a two-year contract with Austrian Football Bundesliga club Wolfsberger AC on 9 July 2021. He made his debut for the club on 25 July, the opening day of the 2021–22 season, coming off the bench as a late substitute for Thorsten Röcher in a 1–1 draw against Austria Klagenfurt. He scored his first goals the following month, securing a 2–2 draw against WSG Tirol by netting a brace.

International career
Baribo made his senior debut for the Israel national team opening in a friendly 0–2 away loss to Germany on 26 March 2022.

On 24 September 2022, Baribo scored the first goal for his native Israel against Albania in the 2022–23 UEFA Nations League in a 2–1 home victory for Israel.

Career statistics

Club

International

Scores and results list Israel's goal tally first.

See also
 List of Jewish footballers
 List of Jews in sports
 List of Israelis

References

External links
 
 
 

1998 births
Living people
Footballers from Eilat
Israeli Sephardi Jews
Portuguese Jews
Israeli footballers
Portuguese footballers
Jewish footballers
Israeli people of Portuguese-Jewish descent
Citizens of Portugal through descent
Association football forwards
Israel international footballers
Israel under-21 international footballers
Israel youth international footballers
Maccabi Petah Tikva F.C. players
Wolfsberger AC players
Liga Leumit players
Israeli Premier League players
Austrian Football Bundesliga players
Israeli expatriate footballers
Portuguese expatriate footballers
Expatriate footballers in Austria
Israeli expatriate sportspeople in Austria
Portuguese expatriate sportspeople in Austria